Operation Commando Eagle was a 2007 military operation of the Iraq War. It began on 21 June 2007, when Iraqi and Coalition forces launched a combined ground and air assault operation against al-Qaeda and other extremist terrorists operating in the Mahmudiyah region of Babil province. The action was intended to curb terrorist activity southwest of Baghdad through a mix of helicopter assaults and Humvee-mounted movements.

The operation

The operation targeted a series of houses which local citizens indicated were being used by al-Qaeda cells to intimidate them and launch attacks against Iraqi and Coalition Forces.

On 21 June, troops of the 2nd Battalion, 14th Infantry Regiment, 2nd BCT, 10th Mountain Division detained three men when their truck was found to contain documents requesting rockets as well as a spool of copper wire, commonly used to build improvised explosive devices. Soldiers of the 2nd Battalion, 4th Brigade, 6th Iraqi Army Division found a large weapons cache, and soldiers of the 2nd Battalion, 15th Field Artillery Regiment, 2nd BCT, 10th Mountain Division discovered multiple series of caches during the operation.

Task Force 2-15 detained 16 individuals, and Company A, 4th Battalion, 31st Infantry Regiment detained nine men and Troop B, 1st Squadron, 89th Cavalry Regiment detained four, all wanted for terrorist attacks or for possessing illegal weapons.

Military units involved
US forces reported to be involved were the 2nd Brigade Combat Team, 10th Mountain Division. Iraqi forces reported to be involved were the 4th Brigade, 6th Iraqi Army Division.

See also

Iraq War troop surge of 2007
Operation Forsythe Park
Operation Imposing Law
Operation Phantom Thunder
Operation Arrowhead Ripper
Operation Marne Torch
Coalition military operations of the Iraq War
List of coalition military operations of the Iraq War

References

Military operations of the Iraq War in 2007
Military operations of the Iraq War involving the United States
Military operations of the Iraq War involving Iraq
Iraqi insurgency (2003–2011)
Conflicts in 2007